The baronial family Adlercreutz is a branch of the commander family Adlercreutz. The major general, later the general of the cavalry and one of the lords of the realm, count Carl Johan Adlercreutz (1757-1815), was created a Swedish baron together with his three sons Fredrik Thomas Adlercreutz (1793-1852), Carl Gustaf Adlercreutz (1799-1883 and Johan Henrik Adlercreutz (1800-1841), and the title should follow the oldest son, son after son in accordance with primogeniture, 30 August 1808 in high quarter Grelsby on Åland by King Gustav IV Adolf of Sweden, although the patent of nobility was issued first 27 February 1810 at Stockholm Palace by King Charles XIII. They were introduced at the Swedish house of lords 15 March 1810 as baronial family number 331. The two younger sons ended their lines themselves 9 April 1883 and 18 October 1841.

Together with this family belongs the comital family Adlercreutz.

The present baron Adlercreutz is Magnus Adlercreutz, born 11 March 1977, who became a baron at his birth, since his father had already inherited the comital title.

Notes

Swedish noble families